R. Kan Albay (born 1 September 1975) is a Flemish film director and actor of Turkish descent.

Filmography

Directing
 Son Care (1996)
 Toothpick, crime (2002)
 The Flemish Vampire, horror (2006)
 Gangsta's hell, horror (2007)
 Coma, drama (2008)

Acting
 Toothpick,  Kahn (2002)
 Emma, 2007
 COMA, a.k.a. Osman Engin (2008)
 Neveneffecten (television)(comedy) (2008)
 Witse (television) (drama) (2009)
 Dossier K(Action-Thriller) (2009)

External links
 official site 
 The Flemish Vampire
 

Belgian film directors
Belgian people of Turkish descent
Living people
1975 births